Blood Ceremony is a Canadian rock band formed in 2006 in Toronto, Ontario. Blood Ceremony's style has been described as "flute-tinged witch rock" and their lyrics are filled with black magic imagery and references to classic horror films. Their music has been also characterized as hard rock, psychedelic folk, progressive rock, and doom metal.

The band is fronted by singer/flutist/organist Alia O'Brien, whose flute solos are reminiscent of Jethro Tull's Ian Anderson. Torontoist has called Blood Ceremony "Toronto's most original band".

History
The band was created by O'Brien with guitarist Sean Kennedy, who is responsible for most of the songwriting.

The band's self-titled debut studio album was released in 2008, followed by Living with the Ancients in 2011, both on Rise Above Records. The albums were reissued on Metal Blade.

Blood Ceremony spent the latter part of 2009 touring throughout Europe with Electric Wizard. During the latter part of 2011 and the early part of 2012, they supported Ghost on their European and North American tours.

They have since released two additional albums, The Eldritch Dark (2013, Metal Blade) and Lord of Misrule (2016, Rise Above).

O'Brien received a Canadian Screen Award nomination for Best Original Song at the 7th Canadian Screen Awards for "Ghost of Love (Onakabazien Remix)", which she cowrote with Sook-Yin Lee and Adam Litovitz for Lee's film Octavio Is Dead!. She also performs as a member of Badge Époque Ensemble.

Blood Ceremony's 5th full length album, The Old Ways Remain is due for release in early 2023.

Style
Blood Ceremony's style has been described as occult rock, and by their label as "flute-tinged witch rock". In a 2011 interview on Finland's NukeTV, O'Brien called their style "heavy rock" and claimed that their distinct sound is the result of each band member having different musical influences. She cited late 1960s and early 1970s progressive rock as crucial to her inspiration, called Jethro Tull her "very first, favorite band", and also listed Black Sabbath, Uriah Heep, Osanna, Pentagram, Witchfinder General, Electric Wizard and Pagan Altar as having a major impact. Guitarist and songwriter Kennedy called Blood Ceremony a "folkier Sabbath", and cited "heavier Black Sabbath", 1980s doom metal and British folk artists such as Pentangle and Fairport Convention as influential.

Members
Current
 Alia O'Brien - lead vocals, flute, organ
 Sean Kennedy - guitars
 Lucas Gadke - bass, backing vocals
 Michael Carrillo - drums
Former
 Chris Landon - bass
 Jeremy Finkelstein - drums
 Andrew Haust - drums

Discography

Studio albums

References

External links

Rise Above Records' Blood Ceremony Page
Metal Blade Records' Blood Ceremony Page

Canadian doom metal musical groups
Musical groups from Toronto
Musical groups established in 2006
Metal Blade Records artists